A College Football All-America Team is selected annually by various organizations to recognize each season's most outstanding players at each position. Certain organizations are recognized by the NCAA as "official" selectors, whose teams are used to determine consensus and unanimous All-Americans. The LSU Tigers football team has had 37 players recognized as consensus All-Americans, with 11 of those being unanimous selections. Gaynell Tinsley was LSU's first consensus (1935) and unanimous (1936) All-American. Five LSU players have been recognized as consensus All-Americans twice: Tinsley, Billy Cannon, Tommy Casanova, Charles Alexander, and Grant Delpit. Cannon is the only LSU player to be unanimously selected twice, doing so in 1958 and 1959. Casanova is LSU's only three-time All-American; he was named a first-team All-American by at least one selector in 1969, 1970, and 1971.

Key

Selectors

Selections

References

LSU Tigers

LSU Tigers football All-Americans